Luca Negri (born 4 October 1973) is an Italian sprint canoer who competed in the late 1990s. He won five medals at the ICF Canoe Sprint World Championships with two golds(K-2 1000 m: 1997, 1998) and three silvers (K-2 500 m: 1997, 1998; K-4 200 m: 1998)

Negri also competed in the K-4 1000 m event at the 1996 Summer Olympics in Atlanta, but was eliminated in the semifinals.

References

1973 births
Canoeists at the 1996 Summer Olympics
Italian male canoeists
Living people
Olympic canoeists of Italy
ICF Canoe Sprint World Championships medalists in kayak
Mediterranean Games medalists in canoeing
Mediterranean Games gold medalists for Italy
Competitors at the 1997 Mediterranean Games
Canoeists of Fiamme Oro
20th-century Italian people